Bayou Plaquemine Brulé (historically spelled Plakemine; translated to "burnt persimmon bayou") is a waterway in the Mermentau River basin of south Louisiana.

One of the first settlers of the area was Michel Comeau.

See also
List of rivers of Louisiana

References

External links
 Map of the southwestern Bayou region

Rivers of Louisiana
Rivers of Acadia Parish, Louisiana